Judge Thomas Dawkins House, also known as The Shrubs, is a historic home located at Union, Union County, South Carolina.  It was built about 1845, and is a two-story clapboard dwelling with a hipped metal roof. The front facade features a five-bay wide verandah supported by six chamfered columns.  It was the residence of Judge Thomas Dawkins, a well-known political leader in Union County during and after the American Civil War.

It was added to the National Register of Historic Places in 1973.

References

Houses on the National Register of Historic Places in South Carolina
Houses completed in 1845
Houses in Union County, South Carolina
National Register of Historic Places in Union County, South Carolina